The 1915 Philadelphia mayoral election saw the election of Thomas B. Smith.

Results

References

1915
Philadelphia
1915 Pennsylvania elections
1910s in Philadelphia